Gaika may refer to:

1358 Gaika
Gaika people
Gaika (musician)